The ATP Challenger 125 tournaments are the second highest tier of annual men's tennis tournaments on the ATP Challenger Tour, with 125 ranking points awarded to each singles champion. They were previously the highest tier of Challenger tournaments before the introduction of ATP Challenger Tour 175 tournaments in 2023.

As of the last full season in 2019, the series included 20 tournaments, however more have since been added as a result of the COVID-19 pandemic.

Events

ATP Points

Singles champions

Statistics

Most titles

See also
 ATP Challenger Tour
 ATP Challenger Tour 175
 ATP Challenger Tour Finals
 ATP Tour
 WTA 125 tournaments

References

External links
 Association of Tennis Professionals (ATP) World Tour official website
 International Tennis Federation (ITF) official website